TMG may refer to:

Computing
 TMG (language)
 Microsoft Forefront Threat Management Gateway
 The Master Genealogist,  software

Science and technology
 Tensiomyography, for detecting muscle properties
 Trimethylglycine, an amino acid derivative 
 Trimethylgallium,  Ga(CH3)3
 Touring motor glider
 Thermal Micrometeoroid Garment, the outer layer of a space suit
 Thermomechanical generator, the Harwell Stirling engine

Music
 Ted Mulry Gang, an Australian rock group
 The Militia Group, a record label
 Tak Matsumoto Group, a Japanese supergroup
 Tiny Meat Gang, an American rap comedy duo
 The Mountain Goats, an American indie rock band

Other media
 Tele München Gruppe,  Munich, Germany
 Telegraaf Media Groep, Netherlands
 Times Media Group, South Africa

Other uses
 Tunney Media Group, fictional owner of NBS on Studio 60 on the Sunset Strip
 Tennessee Meiji Gakuin High School
 Têxtil Manuel Gonçalves, a Portuguese company
 The Monitoring Group, a UK anti-racist charity
 Former NYSE symbol for TransMontaigne
 Trident Media Guard, a French anti-software-piracy company
 Tunisia Monitoring Group, a free-expression group
 Toyota Motorsport GmbH, Cologne, Germany
 The Motorsports Group, a US team